The 2021–22 SailGP Championship was the second season of the SailGP championship. Originally due to be contested in 2020, the season was postponed to 2021 after the first round in Sydney due to the ongoing COVID-19 pandemic and was then extended into the early months of 2022.

The championship was again won by the Australian team. New Zealand was the inaugural winner of the Impact League.

Entries

Team changes 
After only one season, China left the championship. Denmark and Spain joined the championship in Sydney, while New Zealand entered in Bermuda.

Calendar 

Although the opening round in Sydney proceeded as planned, results from the race were declared void upon the postponement of the season until 2021. Nine races were expected in the expanded calendar, and eight were announced before the addition of a new Sydney round. The New Zealand event was removed after organisers were denied permission to enter the country.

Season

Sydney 
The season originally began in Sydney with new teams Spain and Denmark joining, with the former coming second in several fleet races. The British team dominated the opening round ahead of 2019 champions Australia and led the standings 47 to 42 points, with Japan in third on 39 points. Both Spain and Denmark received penalties, Spain for contact with the French boat and Denmark for a rule infringement. However, the eventual postponement of the season to 2021–22 reset the standings.

Results

Round 1: Bermuda 
New Zealand joined the resumed season in Bermuda, where the first day of racing was brought forward to the Friday to avoid poor conditions on Saturday. The Australian team won the first three races, with Britain finishing farther back in the field in the first two races while being penalised in the first race for cutting off the US team. Japan heavily collided with the US in the fourth race which the British team ultimately won, while the Australians won the fifth. Neither the US nor Japan finished race four and neither started race five. This meant that Australia, Great Britain and France progressed to the final, which Britain won.

Round 2: Taranto 
The Italian SailGP saw the introduction of harsher penalties for teams involved in collisions after the incident involving the US and Japanese teams in Bermuda. The Australian team suffered hydraulic failure in the first race and retired. The US team won the first and third fleet races with Japan winning the second. On the second day, New Zealand won the fourth fleet race while Japan won the fifth fleet race. The US, Japan, and Spain qualified for the final, which Japan won. This was the first SailGP final the Australian team did not qualify for. During the final, the US suffered an impact with a submerged object in the water which damaged their rudder, causing it to break down.

Round 3: Plymouth 
Most teams competed with substitute sailors at the Plymouth regatta due to 2020 Summer Olympics commitments. The first two races were won by the Australian team. In the third race, the US team narrowly avoided a collision with the Spanish boat at the race start. Spain was disqualified for the manoeuvre, the first time any competitor had been disqualified in the championship. The US went on to win the third race. Japan won the fourth fleet race and Great Britain the fifth, leaving France, the US, and Australia to compete in the final. Australia won the event, moving them to first place in the championship, drawn on points with Great Britain.

Round 4: Aarhus 

Spain capsized their F50 before the first fleet race and sustained significant damage to the boat's foil. As a result, they did not compete in the first day's races. Denmark won the first fleet race, taking their first victory in the series at their home event. The second fleet race was won by the US team, and the third by the UK. Japan won the fourth and fifth, and were joined by Australia and the UK for the final. Australia won the final race, their second victory of the season.

Round 5: Saint-Tropez 
Great Britain won the first fleet race for the French round, with the US winning the next two. Championship leader Australia suffered hydraulic and electrical failures and consistently finished in the last few positions. Japan won the fourth race and Denmark the fifth, with the former also winning the final to take the championship lead.

Round 6: Cádiz 
The first fleet race was won by Great Britain, with Spain winning on home waters in the second race. The US won the final race of day one. Before the beginning of the second day's racing, the Spanish capsized and caused substantial damage to the F50's wing. Spain was unable to start any of the remaining races, which were won by New Zealand and Australia, with Australia, Great Britain, and the US making the final. Great Britain capsized in the final, allowing Australia to take the win.

Round 7: Sydney

Round 8: San Francisco

Results 
Points were awarded per race for the round leaderboard, with 8 points for the winner, 7 points for second place, 6 points for third, and so on.

Each event hosted multiple races, with the three highest scoring teams after each round facing off to decide the podium order. The winner of that final race won the event, with the final standings of the event leaderboard used to award points for the championship standings, with the winner awarded 10 points, second awarded 9, and so on. The three highest scoring teams at the end of the season competed one-on-one with the winning team awarded the championship.

Impact League 
As part of SailGP's sustainability initiatives, the championship introduced a second leaderboard on which teams compete to have the greatest improvement in the sustainability of the sport. Teams are externally audited after each round against 10 criteria, with the top three ranked teams awarded prize money to be donated to the teams' sustainability partners.

Standings

Notes

References

External links 
 SailGP website

Season 2
SailGP
SailGP
SailGP